Trichocentrum pumilum is a species of orchid found from Brazil to northeastern Argentina.

References

External links 

pumilum
Orchids of Argentina
Orchids of Brazil